Coon Box is an unincorporated community located in Jefferson County, Mississippi, United States. The Coon Box Fork Bridge, which is listed on the National Register of Historic Places, is located one mile southwest of Coon Box.

References

Unincorporated communities in Jefferson County, Mississippi
Unincorporated communities in Mississippi
Natchez Trace